Daniel Yona (born 3 May 1941) is a Tanzanian CCM politician and a former Member of Parliament for Same East constituency. In 2015, he and former finance minister Basil Mramba were sentenced to three years' imprisonment for awarding an audit contract to UK firm Alex Stewart Assayers which meant its operations in Tanzania were exempt from tax. After seven months in prison, the remainder of Mramba's and Yona's sentence was commuted to community service.

References

1941 births
Living people
Chama Cha Mapinduzi MPs
Tanzanian MPs 2005–2010
Finance Ministers of Tanzania
Minaki Secondary School alumni
Institute of Finance Management alumni
Alumni of the University of Strathclyde